is a passenger railway station in the city of Hitachiōmiya, Ibaraki, Japan operated by East Japan Railway Company (JR East).

Lines
Yamagatajuku Station is served by the Suigun Line, and is located 35.2 rail kilometers from the official starting point of the line at Mito Station.

Station layout
The station consists of two opposed side platforms connected to the station building by a footbridge.  The station also serves as the local community center and public library, and is staffed.

Platforms

History
Yamagatajuku Station opened on December 10, 1922. The station was absorbed into the JR East network upon the privatization of the Japanese National Railways (JNR) on April 1, 1987.

Passenger statistics
In fiscal 2019, the station was used by an average of 255 passengers daily (boarding passengers only).

Surrounding area

 former Yamagata Town Hall
Yamagata Post Office

See also
List of railway stations in Japan

References

External links

  JR East Station information 

Railway stations in Ibaraki Prefecture
Suigun Line
Railway stations in Japan opened in 1922
Hitachiōmiya, Ibaraki